The Volkspistole ("People's Pistol") was a program for an emergency German pistol design to help mitigate the loss of pistols, as the German troops had lost more than 110,000 pistols in the first half of 1944, when the project started (by the end of the year, an additional 170,000 had been lost), as Carl Walther GmbH, Mauser, and Spreewerk, the three major producers of the current service pistol, the Walther P38, could not produce P38s fast enough to account for their losses. It was to be assembled from simple steel pressings with a minimum of machined parts and to be used by the Volkssturm. Only prototypes were produced before the end of World War II. These prototypes had various unusual locking systems to figure out a cheaper design that the short recoil action of the P38. They also all reused the P38's magazine, another pivotal point in the plan's goal for low-cost production. Three prototypes were designed by Walther, Mauser and Gustloff-Werke, and all three failed. These prototypes had slightly different actions:

 For the Walther design, a rotating barrel design, extremely unique for the time, and only seen on a handful of modern handguns, such as the Beretta Px4 Storm. The original design failed, and Walther soon switched to a milled slide, contrary to the specifications of the program.
 For the Gustloff-Werke design, they simply submitted a 9x19mm redesign of a previous (also failed) simple blowback prototype of Gustloff-Werke's for the 7.65×21mm Parabellum cartridge designed for the original Luger pistol. While it is rumored that five Gustloff-Werke examples were made, there is no primary source, and no currently remaining designs exist. Gustloff-Werke never designed a successful firearm (their only other major designs being the Volkssturmgewehr and the first pistol), and their only contribution to firearms mainly focused on concentration camp slave labor producing Karabiner 98k.
 For the Mauser design, a gas-delayed blowback system borrowed from the Volkssturmgewehr, which proved too costly and the Mauser pistol was soon switched to a cheaper simple blowback action which also failed. A very small number of designs of gas delayed blowback pistols exist, such as the Heckler & Koch P7, Steyr GB, and more recent Laugo Arms Alien. Each time, the design is intended to increase accuracy, reliability, and overall durability, but never to make the pistol cheaper, in fact, each of the three is or was extremely expensive, raising some questions as to why Mauser assumed that it would be at all suitable for the program. When the most recent, the Alien, was designed in 2020, it retailed for $5,000 US, ten times the MSRP of the most common pistol in the U.S., the Glock 19.

References

 http://bratishka.ru/archiv/2006/11/2006_11_16.php

External links
 Walther Volkspistole Forgotten Weapons
 Mauser Volkspistole Forgotten Weapons

World War II infantry weapons of Germany
Semi-automatic pistols of Germany
9mm Parabellum semi-automatic pistols